Guido Walter Dal Casón (born 4 March 1993) is an Argentine professional footballer who plays as a forward for Colegiales.

Club career
Dal Casón spent time in the youth of Quilmes. He never featured for the first-team in the Argentine Primera División, but was loaned out between 2013 and 2014 to Uruguayan Primera División team Racing Club. He made his professional debut on 20 October 2013 against Juventud, before featuring again six days later vs. Sud América. Those were his only two appearances for Racing Club. In January 2015, Dal Casón joined fellow Primera División team Defensa y Justicia. His first appearance in the Argentine top-flight arrived on 27 September 2015 in a home loss to ex-club Quilmes. Two more games came.

On 22 August 2016, Dal Casón was loaned to All Boys of Primera B Nacional. He went onto score four goals in twenty-eight games for All Boys. Dal Casón departed Defensa in September 2017 to sign for Primera B Nacional side Gimnasia y Esgrima. He scored in his first start for the club, in a 2–0 win over Quilmes on 1 October. Five appearances after, he received the first red card of his career against Instituto. Dal Casón left his Gimnasia y Esgrima loan in July 2018. Later that year, Dal Casón moved to Italy to join Massese of Serie D. One appearance followed on 12 December versus Ghivizzano.

January 2019 saw Dal Casón sign for San Telmo in Primera B Metropolitana. He ended his first six months there with five goals in nineteen appearances as they reached the promotion play-off finals, though would lose to All Boys. On 1 July, Dal Casón headed off to Ecuador with Serie A outfit Macará.

International career
Dal Casón played once for the Argentina U17s at the 2009 FIFA U-17 World Cup. He played the final thirty minutes as a substitute for Matías Sosa in a Group A game against hosts Nigeria.

Career statistics
.

References

External links

1993 births
Living people
People from Quilmes
Argentine footballers
Argentina youth international footballers
Association football forwards
Argentine expatriate footballers
Expatriate footballers in Uruguay
Expatriate footballers in Italy
Expatriate footballers in Ecuador
Argentine expatriate sportspeople in Uruguay
Argentine expatriate sportspeople in Italy
Argentine expatriate sportspeople in Ecuador
Argentine Primera División players
Uruguayan Primera División players
Primera B Metropolitana players
Primera Nacional players
Serie D players
Quilmes Atlético Club footballers
Racing Club de Montevideo players
Defensa y Justicia footballers
All Boys footballers
Gimnasia y Esgrima de Jujuy footballers
U.S. Massese 1919 players
San Telmo footballers
C.S.D. Macará footballers
Club Atlético Colegiales (Argentina) players
Sportspeople from Buenos Aires Province